The 1950 Women's European Volleyball Championship was the second edition of the event, organised by Europe's governing volleyball body, the Confédération Européenne de Volleyball. It was hosted in Sofia, Bulgaria from 14 to 22 October 1950.

Participating teams

Format
The tournament was played in a single round-robin format, with all teams placed in a single group.

Group and matches

|}

|}

Final ranking

References
 Confédération Européenne de Volleyball (CEV)

External links
 Results at todor66.com

European Volleyball Championships
Volleyball Championship
V
Women's European Volleyball Championships
Women's European Volleyball Championship
1950s in Sofia
Sports competitions in Sofia
Women's volleyball in Bulgaria